XXII Corps was a corps in the Union Army during the American Civil War.  It was created on February 2, 1863, to consist of all troops garrisoned in Washington, D.C., and included three infantry divisions and one of cavalry (under Judson Kilpatrick, which left to join the Army of the Potomac during the Gettysburg Campaign).  Many of its units were transferred to the Army of the Potomac during Grant's Overland Campaign.

This Corps did not include the many regiments that passed through Washington, D.C., on the way to the front or away from it.  Nor does it include the many regiments from the Army of the Potomac, Army of Georgia, and Army of the Tennessee that encamped in the area to participate in the Grand Review of the Armies.

History
Civil War Armies at the time took their name from the Department that it was born out of.  This is the reason for the naming of the Army of the Potomac, born out of the Department of the Potomac.  At the time of the war, the Union named most of its departments, and thus its armies, after naturally occurring landmarks, specifically water courses, i.e. The Army of the Potomac, The Army of the James, The Army of the Gulf, etc.  In opposition, the Confederacy named most of their Armies for geographic areas and states.

Department of the East

Comprising all of the United States east of the Mississippi River, about half of which became Confederate territory.  Formed on January 1, 1861, there were many Departments formed within its borders, and finally destablished August 17, 1861.  Its primary focus was to employ a chain of command to all units until the smaller departments could be formed.  Headquartered in Albany, New York, it was commanded by Major General John E. Wool.

Department of Washington, D.C.

Constituted April 9, 1861, to include Washington, D.C., to its original boundaries of Arlington, Virginia, and the state of Maryland as far as Bladensburg.  It was formed to center on the defense of the national capital, and to differentiate it from the Department of the East.  The department was commanded by Lieutenant Colonel Charles F. Smith from April 10 through April 28, 1861, and Colonel (later Brigadier General) Joseph K. Mansfield from April 28, 1861, through the Department's dissolution on July 25, 1861.

Department of the Potomac

The  Department of the Potomac, formed July 25, 1861, and destablished August 16, 1861, provide for the defense of the city of Washington, D.C.  This Department was entrusted with the duty of protecting the United States' capital, with the construction of fortifications.  Before the dissolution of the Department of the Potomac, most of the fortifications in the Washington, D.C., area were constructed, mainly by the regiments that were garrisoned there, most of whom had gone on to form the Army of the Potomac.  Commanded by Major General George B. McClellan.

Military District of Washington

A Military District during the Civil War was a formation within a Department for the purpose of reporting directly to the department commander for administrative affairs.

The Military District of Washington was organized June 26, 1862, to include Washington, D.C.; Alexandria, Virginia; and Fort Washington, Maryland.  It was a District under the Department of the Potomac.  It was incorporated into the Department of the Rappahanock from April 4, 1862, through June 26, 1862, when it again became an independent command.  On February 2, 1863, it merged into the Department of Washington.  Commanded by Brigadier General James S. Wadsworth.

Department of the Rappahannock

The Department of the Rappahannock was formed April 4, 1862, from the original I Corps of the Army of the Potomac, to control the area east of the Blue Ridge Mountains to the Potomac River, the Fredericksburg and Richmond Rail Road and the District of Columbia expanded to include the area between the Potomac and Patuxent Rivers.  It was merged into the Army of Virginia as III Corps on June 26, 1862, with Major General Irwin McDowell as its commander.

Defenses of Washington, D.C.

The Defenses of Washington D.C. was a short lived command, from September 2, 1862, through February 2, 1863. used for the consolidation of all the defenses of the area including and surrounding Washington, D.C.  Its main focus was on the maintaining of the fortifications in extending in a ring around Washington, D.C.

Department of Washington

On February 2, 1863, the Department of Washington was re-formed to encompass the area from north of the Potomac from Piscataway Creek to Annapolis Junction (near present-day Fort Meade), west to the Monocacy River, south to the Bull Run Mountains by way of Goose Creek, then east to Occoquan River.  The size of it would expand throughout the war to include the entirety of the counties in the surrounding states of Maryland and Virginia.

The Quartermaster Department of the Department of Washington was the largest Quartermaster Department in the Union Army.  Duties as varied as building, maintenance of fortifications, supplies, road building, transportation, and ordnance testing as well as many other duties were taken over by the quartermasters of the Washington Department.  Washington, D.C., also served as a transship point for supplies and materiel destined to both the Army of the Potomac and Army of the James.

XXII Corps

A Corps is a grouping of two to six divisions, providing a level of the chain of command typically commanded by a major general.  Corps were first created by an Act of Congress on July 17, 1862, but Major General George B. McClellan had instituted them in the spring of 1862.  Before this time, the formations were known as either "Wings" or "Grand Divisions".  Most Corps came under the operational command of an Army, but the XXII Corps did not.

XXII Corps was formed as a Corps under the Department of Washington on February 2, 1863.  As was tradition, its commanders doubled as commanders of the Department of Washington.  During its time, many of the regiments that were fought out arrived to reconstitute and would then be transferred back out, most of them from or to the Army of the Potomac.

Battles

Mosby's Raids

During the time of existence of the 43rd Battalion Virginia Cavalry, better known as Mosby's Rangers, Mosby's Command, or Mosby's Raiders, commanded by Colonel John S. Mosby, made many forays in the area known as Mosby's Confederacy which extended from Loudoun County to Fairfax County, Virginia.  Many of the raids it performed came into the area protected by XXII Corps, and many skirmishes with Brigadier General William Gamble's Cavalry Division, as well as various other XXII Corps units.  During its reign, Mosby's Raiders captured Brigadier General Edwin H. Stoughton (then commanding the 2nd Vermont Brigade), cut telegraph wires during Early's Valley Campaign and numerous raids against rail lines and supply stations.

Battle of Fort Stevens

The corps took part in the defense of Washington during Jubal Early's Washington Raid of 1864, playing a major role in the defense of Fort Stevens on July 11, 1864. Hardin's Division held the skirmish lines and engaged in small engagements, suffering 73 killed and wounded.  The following day, Early found the works held by veteran soldiers of Major General Horatio Wright's VI Corps and Brevet Brigadier General William Emory's XIX Corps.  After making a small fight, Early would withdraw, crossing back into Virginia the next day.

Command history

Notable officers

Components of XXII Corps
Many Regiments and Brigades serving in the XXII Corps were only temporarily assigned to it.  Some mainly served during times when they were reconstituting due to battle casualties, while others were trained in the vicinity of Washington before going into the field.  Yet others were heavy artillery regiments assigned to the fortifications surrounding the capital.  Many units, including heavy artillery regiments, left when more soldiers were needed during Grant's Overland Campaign and continued through the Richmond-Petersburg Campaign until the end of the war.  Some units began serving before the XXII Corps was formed.

Famed Brigades in XXII Corps

The California Brigade was formed by Oregon Senator and Colonel Edwin Baker to have a California presence in the Eastern Theater.  After the death of Colonel Baker at the Battle of Balls Bluff, the brigade was redesignated the Philadelphia Brigade. Made up of the 1st, 2nd, 3rd, and 5th California Infantry.  After redesignation as the Philadelphia Brigade, it consisted of the 69th, 71st, 72nd, and 106th Pennsylvania Infantry.

The First New Jersey Brigade was a Brigade formed by the state of New Jersey while defending Washington, D.C.  This was the first brigade in the Civil War to be formed with the intention of encompassing regiments from one state.  It consisted of the 1st, 2nd, 3rd, 4th, and 10th New Jersey Infantry.  By the end of the war, at different it would have up to eight New Jersey regiments.

The Pennsylvania Reserve Division was formed out of an overflow of volunteers over the amount requested by the Department of War.  After the Secretary of War declined to accept the new units into Federal Service, they were formed, equipped and maintained by the State of Pennsylvania.  During its service in Washington, D.C., it was composed of the 3rd, 4th, and 8th Pennsylvania Reserves.

Vermont gave two brigades to the defenses of Washington, D.C.  The 1st Vermont Brigade, composed of the 2nd, 3rd, 4th, and 6th Vermont Infantry.  It was brigaded together through the efforts of Colonel William F. "Baldy" Smith who went to his West Point classmate and friend, Major General George B. McClellan.

The 2nd Vermont Brigade, composed of 12th, 13th, 14th, 15th, and 16th Vermont Infantry, all nine-month regiments, was formed October 27, 1862.

The Iron Brigade was the only named brigade to come from varied states, the 2nd, 6th, and 7th Wisconsin Infantry, along with the 19th Indiana Infantry and was formed on October 1, 1861. Although at the time, it wasn't known by this name, simply known as 3rd Brigade, I Corps.  It wouldn't earn the moniker for almost a year, during the Battle of South Mountain during the Antietam Campaign.

Connecticut

Delaware

District of Columbia

Illinois

Indiana

Maine

Maryland

Massachusetts

New Hampshire

New Jersey

New York

Ohio

Pennsylvania

Vermont

United States Volunteers

See also
Washington, D.C., in the American Civil War
List of corps of the United States
Lists of American Civil War Regiments by State
Baltimore riot of 1861
First Bull Run Union order of battle
Field artillery in the American Civil War
Siege artillery in the American Civil War
Infantry in the American Civil War
Military leadership in the American Civil War#The Union
Habeas corpus#Suspension during the Civil War and Reconstruction

Notes

References
 Boatner, Mark M. III, The Civil War Dictionary: Revised Edition, David McKay Company, Inc., 1984.
Eicher, John H., and Eicher, David J., Civil War High Commands, Stanford University Press, 2001 
 Fox, William F., Regimental Losses in the American Civil War, reprinted by Morningside Bookshop, Dayton, Ohio, 1993, .
The War of the Rebellion: Official Records of the Union and Confederate Armies at Making of America, Cornell University

External links
XXII Corps history

22
Washington, D.C., in the American Civil War
Civil War defenses of Washington, D.C.
Military units and formations established in 1863
Military units and formations disestablished in 1865
1863 establishments in the United States